Helen Brown (née Blackman; born 1954) is a New Zealand-born author and columnist, best known for her memoirs about cats and the meaning of life. Her book Cleo was a New York Times Best Seller and a film adaptation is in development by John Barnett (producer of Whale Rider) through his company Endeavour Ventures Ltd.

Personal life
Brown was born in 1954 in New Plymouth. She studied journalism at Wellington Polytechnic. At age 18 she flew to England to marry her first husband, Steve, whom she had met three years prior. They returned to New Zealand and had two sons, Sam and Rob. Sam was hit by a car and killed on 21 January 1983, aged 9. Soon after, her family adopted a kitten, about which she wrote her best-selling book Cleo. The book is about a small black cat who helped mend a family's broken hearts. Cleo lived to be 23 years old. Brown had one more child, Lydia, with her first husband before they divorced.

Brown married her second husband, Philip Gentry, in 1991. Together they had one daughter, Katharine. They moved to Melbourne in 1997 and have lived there since. Brown underwent a mastectomy after being diagnosed with breast cancer. During recovery, her sister suggested she get another cat. She adopted a Siamese cat and named him Jonah, after Jonah Lomu the famous rugby player. Jonah became the subject of her next book, After Cleo.

Awards
 1991 Nuffield Press Fellowship – Cambridge University of United Kingdom
 2005 Columnist of the Year – Magazine Publishers Association of New Zealand
 2007 Columnist of the Year – Magazine Publishers Association of New Zealand
 2008 Columnist of the Year – Magazine Publishers Association of New Zealand
 2009 Columnist of the Year – Qantas Media Awards

Works
 Don't Let Me Put You Off: How to Survive in New Zealand Suburbia (1981)
 Confessions of a Bride Doll (1983)
 Tomorrow, When It's Summer (1987)
 Clouds of Happiness (1988)
 Fresh Starts And Finishing Lines (1990)
 A Guide to Modern Manners (1991)
 In Deep (1996)
 From the Heart (2001)
 Florascope (2003)
 Cleo (2010)
 After Cleo (2013), published in the US as Cats and Daughters
 Tumbledown Manor (2014)
 Bono (2018)
 Cleo & Rob (2019)

References

External links
Official website

1954 births
Living people
New Zealand women novelists
New Zealand columnists
People from New Plymouth
New Zealand women columnists